Laurie Mahoney (14 January 1914 – 31 January 2008) was a New Zealand cricketer. He played in two first-class matches for Canterbury in 1948/49.

See also
 List of Canterbury representative cricketers

References

External links
 

1914 births
2008 deaths
New Zealand cricketers
Canterbury cricketers
Cricketers from Christchurch